Gayan may refer to:

 Gayan District, a district in Paktika Province, Afghanistan
 Gayan, Hautes-Pyrénées, at commune in the Hautes-Pyrénées department, France